| tries = {{#expr:
 + 6 + 1 + 1 + 4 + 3 + 7
 + 1 + 1 + 6 + 2 + 5 + 3
 + 3 + 4 + 2 + 5 + 7 + 3
 + 6 + 5 + 6 + 3 + 8 + 2
 + 0 + 4 + 2 + 2 + 1 + 2
 + 7 + 6 + 2 + 1 + 3 + 2
 + 3 + 5 + 3 + 1 + 1 + 0
 + 8 + 3 + 4 + 5 + 5 + 4
 + 4 + 1 + 5 + 2 + 4 + 8
+ 2 + 1 + 1 + 2 + 2
+ 1 + 2 + 2 + 2 + 4 + 1
+ 1 + 5 + 2 + 1 + 2
+ 2 + 9 + 7 + 1 + 5
+ 6 + 2 + 5 + 6 + 12
+ 7 + 5 + 2 + 5 + 4 + 7
+ 6 + 4 + 3 + 5 + 3 + 6
 + 5
+ 5 + 4 + 0 + 1 + 2 + 5
+ 1 + 4 + 3 + 2 + 1 + 8
 + 3
 + 5
+ 2 + 10 + 7 + 8 + 4 + 5
+ 10 + 3 + 4 + 7 + 3 + 3
 + 9
+ 6 + 5 + 6 + 2 + 5 + 9
+ 8 + 3 + 3 + 3 + 9 + 5
+ 3 + 1 + 4
}}
| top point scorer = Dan Biggar (Ospreys)(219 points)
| top try scorer = 
| website = www.rabodirectpro12.com
| prevseason = 2012–13
| nextseason = 2014–15
}}
The 2013–14 Pro12 (also known as the RaboDirect Pro12 for sponsorship reasons) was the 13th season of the Pro12 rugby union competition originally known as the Celtic League, the fourth with its current 12-team format, and the third with RaboDirect as title sponsor.

Leinster were the defending champions, having beaten Ulster in the 2013 playoff final.

The twelve competing teams were the four Irish teams, Connacht, Leinster, Munster and Ulster; two Scottish teams, Edinburgh and Glasgow Warriors; four Welsh teams, Cardiff Blues, Newport Gwent Dragons, Ospreys and Scarlets; and two Italian teams, Benetton Treviso and Zebre.

Changes for the season

Ireland
New Zealand native Pat Lam replaced Eric Elwood as head coach of Connacht, following Elwood's decision to step down, while out-half Dan Parks took on a coaching role with Connacht U18 Schools and Clubs while continuing to play with the senior team. Following changes between captains in previous seasons the start of the season saw three players, Gavin Duffy, John Muldoon and Michael Swift, captain the side jointly. After a poor run of form culminating in a 43–10 defeat against Edinburgh, former Chiefs captain Craig Clarke was made team captain.

Following the departure of head coach Joe Schmidt, who left to take over the Irish national team, Leinster were coached by Matt O'Connor. O'Connor joined Leinster from 2012–13 Aviva Premiership winners Leicester Tigers.

Back row player, Peter O'Mahony was appointed as Munster captain following the retirement of previous captain Doug Howlett. Munster entered their first league season without long-serving out-half Ronan O'Gara, as he moved to a coaching role with Racing Métro following his retirement from playing. He left as the team's all-time leading scorer, as well as the record holder for number of appearances for the province.

Italy

Scotland
With the departure of Michael Bradley, who left the team after two seasons as coach, Edinburgh were coached by South Africa native Alan Solomons. Solomons joined the team after coming from a Director of Rugby role with South African side, the Southern Kings.

Wales
Cardiff Blues replaced the grass playing surface at their home grounds with a new artificial pitch. On 16 August 2013, hooker Matthew Rees was named as captain for the season in place of Andries Pretorius. However, Rees was later diagnosed with testicular cancer, and was forced to take a leave of absence from the game to receive treatment.

Former Ospreys and London Welsh coach Lyn Jones was appointed Director of Rugby for Newport Gwent Dragons, with former Wales captain Kingsley Jones as his assistant. Previous season's head coach Darren Edwards stays on with the club, working under Lyn Jones in the new structure. Also, after serving as skipper for the side in the 2012–13 season, Lewis Evans was replaced by Andrew Coombs as Dragons captain.

Teams

Table

Fixtures
The weekend dates for the 2013–14 season were announced on 19 July 2013.
  All times are local.

Round 1

Round 2

Round 3

Round 4

Round 5

Round 6

Round 7

Round 8

Round 9

Round 10

Round 11

1872 Cup 1st round

Round 12

Round 13

Round 14

Round 15

Round 16

Round 14 rescheduled match

This match – originally scheduled to be held during Round 14, on 14 February 2014 – was postponed due to a waterlogged pitch.

Round 17

Round 18

Round 13 rescheduled match

This match – originally scheduled to be held during Round 13, on 9 February 2014 – was postponed due to a waterlogged pitch.

Round 10 rescheduled match

This match – originally scheduled to be held during Round 10, on 20 December 2013 – was postponed due to a waterlogged pitch.

Round 19

Round 20

Judgement Day

Round 12 rescheduled match

1872 Cup 2nd round

This match – originally scheduled to be held during Round 12, on 1 January 2014 – was postponed due to a waterlogged pitch.

Round 21

Round 22

Play-offs

Semi-finals
The semi-finals will follow a 1 v 4, 2 v 3 system with the games being played at the home ground of the higher placed teams.

Final

Leading scorers
Note: Flags to the left of player names indicate national team as has been defined under IRB eligibility rules, or primary nationality for players who have not yet earned international senior caps. Players may hold one or more non-IRB nationalities.

Top points scorers

Top try scorers

End-of-season awards

2013/2014 Dream Team

References

External links

2013–14 Pro12 at ESPN

 
 
2013-14
2013–14 in Irish rugby union
2013–14 in Welsh rugby union
2013–14 in Scottish rugby union
2013–14 in Italian rugby union